The 2017 Odlum Brown Vancouver Open was a professional tennis tournament played on outdoor hard courts. It was the 12th edition, for men, and 15th edition, for women, of the tournament and part of the 2017 ATP Challenger Tour and the 2017 ITF Women's Circuit, offering totals of $100,000, for men, and $100,000, for women, in prize money. It took place in West Vancouver, British Columbia, Canada between August 14 to August 20, 2017.

Men's singles main-draw entrants

Seeds

1 Rankings are as of August 7, 2017

Other entrants
The following players received wildcards into the singles main draw:
 Philip Bester
 Filip Peliwo
 Brayden Schnur
 Benjamin Sigouin

The following players received entry into the singles main draw as special exempts:
 Liam Broady
 Taylor Fritz

The following players received entry from the qualifying draw:
 Takanyi Garanganga
 Lloyd Harris
 Thai-Son Kwiatkowski
 Max Purcell

The following players received entry as lucky losers:
 JC Aragone
 Marc Polmans
 Ryan Shane

Women's singles main-draw entrants

Seeds

1 Rankings are as of August 7, 2017

Other entrants
The following players received wildcards into the singles main draw:
 Katherine Sebov
 Aleksandra Wozniak
 Carol Zhao

The following players entered the singles main draw with a protected ranking:
 Polona Hercog
 Stefanie Vögele

The following players received entry from the qualifying draw:
 Ysaline Bonaventure
 Priscilla Hon
 Eri Hozumi
 Sílvia Soler Espinosa

Champions

Men's singles

 Cedrik-Marcel Stebe def.  Jordan Thompson, 6–0, 6–1

Women's singles

 Maryna Zanevska def.  Danka Kovinić, 5–7, 6–1, 6–3

Men's doubles

 James Cerretani /  Neal Skupski def.  Treat Huey /  Robert Lindstedt, 7–6(8–6), 6–2

Women's doubles

 Jessica Moore /  Jocelyn Rae def.  Desirae Krawczyk /  Giuliana Olmos, 6–1, 7–5

External links
Official website

Odlum Brown Vancouver Open
Odlum Brown Vancouver Open
Vancouver Open
Odlum Brown Vancouver Open